Wittia yazakii is a moth of the family Erebidae. It is found in Guangdong, China.

The forewings bright yellow and the hindwings are yellow without a pattern.

Etymology
The new species is named in honor of Mr K. Yazaki, Tokyo, Japan.

References

External links

Moths described in 2012
Endemic fauna of China
Lithosiina